The forth season of the American reality competition series Ultimate Beastmaster premiered exclusively via Netflix's web streaming service on March 4, 2023. The show consists of 9 Beastmaster episodes which were released simultaneously on Netflix worldwide.

Hosts
Each country has their own set of two hosts/commentators for the competition. They are as follows:

Not only do each pair of hosts provide color commentary for each of the nine localized versions, but the foreign commentators also make appearances in each localized version, with their commentary presented by subtitles. If a contestant completes a course, all hosts' reactions are shown on screen. Furthermore, since all host booths are placed, this year, in a circular row on the Ultimate Beastmaster set, commentators from one localization can easily walk over into the booth of another localized version.

The Beast
The obstacle course for the competition is known as The Beast, and it is divided into 3 Levels. Level 4 has been added to the Beast for the Finals. Competitors with the highest scores after each level move on while those with the lowest scores are eliminated, with ties decided in favor of the competitor with the lowest time. Unlike the first season (where scores reset on Level 4) and the previous season (where scores accrue on all four levels), all scores reset at the start of the level. The obstacles are suspended over a body of red-tinted water referred to as Beast Blood (except for Level 3 which has blue-tinted water and is referred to as the Fuel of the Pyramid) and housed in a giant steel frame that takes the form of a large animal. A competitor is considered to have failed a Level if all four limbs are submerged into the Beast Blood/Fuel of the Pyramid. Failure ends the attempt at the current Level but confers no penalties.

This season a new Thruster has been added, which includes 10-40 points depending on your level, giving the competitors a certain number of points, depending on what level they fast hit the Thruster. In addition, a final Point dismount worth 10, for level one, 20, for level 2, and 30, for level 3,  these points have been added to the end of every level.

This season also features a tournament-style bracket, in which two athletes advance from each episode to a semifinal round then to a final round, earning themselves $10,000, where they fight for the title of Ultimate Beastmaster and $50,000. In the semifinals, the top 6 competitors compete, with the top 3 winning $25,000 and moving on to the finals. Competitors must run the entire course (Levels 1-3) in one go and get the farthest the fastest. If they fail once, they are given an extra life they can use to try again from one of five checkpoints throughout the course, but at the cost of the points accrued after crossing the checkpoint. Should the competitor choose not to use it, however, the extra life is then forfeited and cannot be used later.

Level 1
In Level 1 all nine competitors compete with the top six scorers moving on. 
 Lockjaw - Competitors must scale a pole that gets as thin as 8 in. as competitors progress.
 Bungie Grinders - Competitors must cross two gear-like platforms shaped similarly to the Grinders from Season 2. The first one is stationary while the second swings back-and-forth.
 Faceplant - Competitors stand on a narrow platform, hands braced against panels on either side, as they are tilted forward to a 45° angle. They must then jump to a chain and swing to the next obstacle. The first Point Thruster is located higher up the chain. Unlike previous seasons, the chain is positioned towards the side a bit. This is the first of five checkpoints in the Semifinals.
 Energy Coils -  Competitors must jump across 3 semi-stationary hanging platforms that start moving once the competitor lands on them. A Point Thruster is located between the second and third platform.
At the end of the Energy Coils, there are two different paths taken, often with interchangeable obstacles, depending on the episode.

Path 1
 Grip Knife  -  Competitors must jump across a series of 2 knife shaped monkey bars. A Point Thruster is located in between each seesaw. Interchangeable with Rope Burn or the Dead Bolts; replaced with Break Neck for the Semifinals.
 Rope Burn -  Competitors must use a rope to scale a giant tube that gets wider midway through. A Point Thruster is located just before the tube gets wider. Interchangeable with The Rack or the Dead Bolts; replaced with Break Neck for the Semifinals.
 Dead Bolts -  Competitors must jump across a series of 4 semi-stationary hanging bolts, each at a slightly different angle; the last two are placed 6 ft. apart from each other. A Point Thruster is located between the second and third Deadbolts while a Mega Thruster is located between the last two Deadbolts. Interchangeable with The Rack or Rope Burn; replaced with Break Neck for the Semifinals.
 Break Neck -  Competitors must cross a series of 3 wheels, two of which spin automatically while the second one is stationary, each with 6 Ropes, two at the least fall down. Exclusive to the Semifinals.
 Pole Drive -  Competitors must cross a series of 3 spinning gears, two counter-clockwise and the second clockwise, with 4 dangling poles. Exclusive to the Finals.
 Mag Wall - Competitors navigate horizontally across a climbing wall. Every 2 seconds the magnetic handholds are released and fall into the Beast's blood. The wall features an inversion, from which the competitors must jump to the finishing platform. A Point Thruster is located towards the end of the Mag Wall.
Path 2
 Wheel Power - Competitors must use their momentum to turn a rolling beam with monkey bars. Interchangeable with Rib Cage Row or Crank Shaft.
 Rib Cage Row - Competitors must swing across 4 sets of bars, the distance between each set as far as 9 ft. the farther competitors go. Interchangeable with Wheel Power or Crank Shaft.
 Crank Shaft - Competitors must cross a rotating beam with 6 heptagonal-platforms. Interchangeable with Wheel Power or Rib Cage Row.
 Crash Pads - Similar to the Bungee Beds from season 1's Level 3, competitors must traverse two unstable platforms suspended at varying heights by bungee chords. A Point Thruster is located near the first Crash Pad
Each individual portion of an obstacle is worth 5 points.

Level 2
In Level 2 the top six competitors compete, with the top four scorers moving on. Similar to Season 1, some obstacles interchange with each other.
 Drop Zone - Competitors must scale an angled-trampoline to a blue ramp. A Point Thruster is (sometimes) located near the base of the ramp. This is the second of five checkpoints for the Semifinals.
 Stomach Churn - Competitors must jump from the ramp to a spinning hexagonal-platform near the base of Digestive Track. The drop is said to be 5 ft down. This is the third of five checkpoints for the Semifinals.
 Digestive Track - Jumping from the spinning platform into a tube, competitors must climb the tube before it sinks and jump to the next obstacle.
 Dreadmills - Competitors must cross a pair of suspended treadmills and leap to a platform. A Point Thruster is located after the second Dreadmill.
 Shape Shifter - Competitors must jump from a platform to cross 30 ft. of octagonal-footholds. A Point Thruster is located midway across.. Replaced with the Hole Cross for the Semifinals and Chain Reaction for the Finals.
 Hole Cross - Competitors must cross a open pole while hanging on to wheels. A Point Thruster is located midway across. This is the fourth of five checkpoints for the Semifinals. Exclusive to the Semifinals. Replaced with Chain Reaction for the Finals.
 Chain Reaction - Competitors must swing across 3 suspended chains and make it into Spinal Tubes. A Point Thruster is located near the top on the side of the second chain. Exclusive to the Finals
 Spinal Tubes - Competitors must leap across 5, two D looking tubes then dismount to the finishing platform. A Point Thruster is located near the side of the second tube.
Each individual portion of an obstacle is worth 5 points.

Level 3
In Level 3, also known as the Energy Pyramid, the top 4 scorers compete, with the top 2 advancing to the Semifinals (3 moving on to Level 4 for the Finals).
 Ejector - Competitors must mount a forward-moving treadmill and attempt to grab a suspended a pole-rope (or a regular black rope in some episodes) as it swings through a curved track, then reach for an additional pole-rope/rope located just before Power Surge. 3 Point Thrusters are located at the beginning, middle, and end of the track. This is the last of five checkpoints for the Semifinals.
 Power Surge - Competitors must work their way through three tubes structure made of pipe and chain before they each sink into the water. The first is placed vertically while the rest is shaped similarly to the previous seasons' Coil Crawl. In contrast to the previous seasons', the last ring only sinks occasionally. A Point Thruster is located midway through.
 Viper Climb- Competitors must scale an 80 ft helix. A Point Thruster is located 3/4ths of the way up.
 Hangman - Competitors must use grip handles to swing through a set of 10 V-shaped bars. A Point Thruster is located near the 5th V-shaped bar
 Bounce Tail - Competitors must swing from the tenth V-shaped bar to a 5 by 5 platform suspended by bungie cords then jump to the climbing wall to finsh the level.
 Climbing Wall  - Competitors must climb a wall up to the final platform. A Point Thruster is located at the bottom of the wall.
Individual portions of obstacles are worth 5 points.

Level 4
In Level 4 the top 2 finalists compete on an 80 ft climbing wall in 660 seconds (6 minutes), with the top 1 winning $50,000 and being crowned the Ultimate Beastmaster. Unlike the previous seasons, this level is exclusive to the Finals, and competitors each compete one-at-a-time. Points can only be attained through three 40 Point Thrusters placed throughout, each worth 10 points more than the previous Thruster.
 Ricochet - Competitors navigate back-and-forth between 2 walls.
At the end of Ricochet, competitors must make a choice between two paths.
 Full Tilt - Competitors must scale six blocks with two handholds which tilt down as they grab them.
 Drop Tank - Competitors must scale three platforms which drop down 18 in. as they step on them.
 Mother Board - Competitors must ascend a large pegboard. The first Thruster (worth 40 points is located towards the bottom of the board.)
At the end of Mother Board, competitors must make a choice between another two paths.
 Razor's Edge - Competitors must cross a shaky bridge made up of trapezoidal platforms.
 Vertigo - Competitors must scale a swirling beam.
 Ventilator - Competitors must ascend in one of three ways:
Rope Climb - A narrow vertical crevice with a rope positioned left.
I-Beam Cross - A narrow beam positioned right in the middle that gets thinner as competitors climb up.
The second Thruster (worth 50 points) is located at the bottom of the I-Beam.
Chimney Climb - A narrow vertical crevice positioned right.
The final Thruster, called the Mega Thruster (worth 1,000 points) is located at the top of Ventilator.
Competitors are given a certain time to accrue the highest possible score, with ties decided in favor of the competitor who finished the fastest. There is no failure condition for Level 4, and competitors may attempt to regain their footing if they lose grip on the wall.

Episodes

Episode 1: The Beast Evolves

Competitors
 Max Sprenger, 22 Media and Computer Science Student - Team Germany - Semifinalist
 James Drake, 36 Non-Profit Director - Team USA - Semifinalist
 Javier Lopez, 21 Gymnast - Team Mexico - Eliminated on Level 3
 Nathan Caparros, 24 Climbing Instructor - Team France - Eliminated on Level 3
 Gareth Leah, 30 Travel Writer - Team UK - Eliminated on Level 2
 Sung Hyuk Choi, 36 Pole Dancer - Team South Korea - Eliminated on Level 2
 Edoardo Bocchio Vega, 23 Environmental Policy Student - Team Italy - Eliminated on Level 1
 Morgan-Rose Moroney, 20 Physiotherapy Student - Team Australia - Eliminated on Level 1
 Mauro Yoshida, 29 Gym Owner - Team Brazil - Eliminated on Level 1

Level 1
Level 1 Configuration: Lockjaw, Gear Head, Faceplant, Energy Coils, Grip Knife, Mag Wall

Level 2

Level 3

Semifinalists:  Max Sprenger and  James Drake

Episode 2: Champions Collide

Competitors
 Jayden Irving, 26 Surfer - Team Australia - Semifinalist
 Kie Green, 23 Boxing Student - Team USA - Semifinalist
 David Ferguson, 27 Professional Muay Thai Boxer - Team UK - Eliminated on Level 3
 Matteo Curiel, 29 Personal Trainer - Team Italy - Eliminated on Level 3
 Gaël Le Moigne, 28 Renewable Energy Entrepreneur - Team France - Eliminated on Level 2
 Jessica Wielens, 30 Alternative Medicine Practitioner - Team Germany - Eliminated on Level 2
 Alanah Alanis, 30 Gym Owner - Team Mexico - Eliminated on Level 1
 Jabee Kim, 31 Professional Climber - Team South Korea - Eliminated on Level 1
 Felipe Ho Foganholo, 18 Professional Climber - Team Brazil - Eliminated on Level 1

Level 1
Level 1 Configuration: Lockjaw, Bungie Grinders, Faceplant, Energy Coils, Wheel Power, Crash Pads

Level 2

Level 3

Semifinalists:  Jayden Irving and  Kie Green

Episode 3: Strive for Greatness

Competitors 
 Keiha Dhruev, 23 Climbing Instructor - Team UK - Semifinalist
 Miguel Angel Hernandez, 35 Aerial Acrobat - Team Mexico - Semifinalist
 Elvis Gjeci, 23 Gymnastics Coach - Team Italy - Eliminated on Level 3
 Thomas Ballet, 28 Human Resources Consultant - Team France - Eliminated on Level 3
 Chloé Henry, 30 Pole Vaulter - Team USA - Eliminated on Level 2
 Jun Kim, 29 Photographer - Team Germany - Eliminated on Level 2
 Patricia Antunes Silva, 31 Chef - Team Brazil - Eliminated on Level 1
 David Georgiou, 30 Gym Owner - Team Australia - Eliminated on Level 1
 Nae Yun Yang, 26 Swimming Coach - Team South Korea - Eliminated on Level 1

Level 1 
Level 1 Configuration: Lockjaw, Bungie Grinders, Faceplant, Energy Coils, Rope Burn, Mag Wall

Level 2

Level 3 

Semifinalists:  Keiha Dhruev and  Miguel Angel Hernandez

Episode 4: Semifinal #1

Competitors
 Jayden Irving, 26 Surfer - Team Australia - Episode 2 - Finalist
 Kie Green, 23 Boxing Student - Team USA - Episode 2 - Finalist
 James Drake 36 Non-Profit Director - Team USA - Episode 1 - Finalist
 Max Sprenger, 22 Media and Computer Science Student - Team Germany - Episode 1 - Eliminated
 Keiha Dhruev, 23 Climbing Instructor - Team UK - Episode 3 - Eliminated
 Miguel Angel Hernandez, 35 Aerial Acrobat - Team Mexico - Episode 3 - Eliminated

Level 1 Configuration: Lockjaw, Bungie Grinders, Faceplant, Energy Coils, Break Neck, Mag Wall

Episode 5: A New Battle Begins

Competitors 
 Jesse Turner, 27 Stuntman - Team Australia - Semifinalist
 Norman Lichtenberg, 24 Parkour Performer - Team Germany - Semifinalist
 Laura Basta, 26 Circus Acrobatic Instructor - Team France - Eliminated on Level 1
 Alex Ray, 27 Social Media Influencer - Team USA - Eliminated on Level 3
 Rafael De Sousa, 32 Gymnastics Instructor - Team Brazil - Eliminated on Level 2
 Angelika Rainer, 30 Professional Ice Climber - Team Italy - Eliminated on Level 2
 Jong Seok Son, 28 Speed Climber - Team South Korea - Eliminated on Level 1
 Andrew French, 30 Design Engineer - Team UK - Eliminated on Level 1
 Allan Cardoso, 19 Business Management Student - Team Mexico - Eliminated on Level 3 with Injury

Level 1 
Level 1 Configuration: Lockjaw, Gear Head, Faceplant, Energy Coils, Rib Cage Row, Crash Pads

Level 2

Level 3 
Semifinalists:  Jesse Turner and  Norman Litchenberg

Episode 6: Overcoming the Odds

Competitors 
 Hector Martinez, 20 Professional Climber - Team Mexico - Semifinalist
 Marty Bartow, 22 Rock Climbing Instructor - Team USA - Semifinalist
 Mark Greenham, 30 Fashion Designer - Team Australia - Eliminated on level 3
 Dave Ardito Rioja, 29 Filmmaker - Team Germany - Eliminated on level 3
 Min Je Joo, 33 Spin Instructor - Team South Korea - Eliminated on Level 2
 Imogen Horrocks, 18 Champion Climber - Team UK - Eliminated on Level 2
 Alessandro Cazzavacca, 30 Landscaper - Team Italy - Eliminated on Level 1
 Thalisson Glaner Fagundes, 30 Soccer Coach - Team Brazil - Eliminated on Level 1
 Nicolas Cerquant, 31 Fitness Club Owner - Team France - Eliminated on Level 1

Level 1 
Level 1 Configuration: Lockjaw, Gear Head, Faceplant, Hyper Jump, Crank Shaft, Crash Pads

Level 2

Level 3 

Semifinalists:  Hector Martinez and  Marty Bartow 

!!Episode 7: For the Glory!!

Competitors 
 Corbin Mackin, 29 Veteran - Team UK - Semifinalist
 Walker Kearney, 36 Stay-At-Home Dad - Team USA - Semifinalist
 Luke Shelton,  29 Construction Worker - Team Australia - Eliminated on level 3
 Roberto Del Pozzo, 23 Parkour Teacher - Team Italy - Eliminated on Level 3
 Bernardo Massuchin, 25 Criminal Lawyer - Team Brazil - Eliminated on Level 2
 Mauricio Martinez, 33 Personal Fitness Trainer - Team Mexico - Eliminated on Level 2
 Gemma Lee, 31 Crossfit Trainer - Team South Korea - Eliminated on Level 1
 Mathieu Sarouti, 32 Aeronautical Engineer - Team France - Eliminated on Level 1
 Alix Arndt, 38 Agricultural Sales - Team Germany - Eliminated on Level 1

Level 2

Level 3 

Semifinalists:  Corbin Mackin and  Walker Kearney

Episode 8: Semifinal #2

Competitors
 Marty Bartow, 22 Rock Climbing Instructor - Team USA - Episode 6 - Finalist
 Hector Martinez, 20 Professional Climber - Team Mexico - Episode 6 - Finalist
 Corbin Mackin, 29 Veteran - Team UK - Episode 7 - Finalist
 Walker Kearney, 36 Stay-At-Home Dad - Team USA - Episode 7 - Eliminated
 Jesse Turner, 27 Stuntman - Team Australia - Episode 5 - Eliminated
 Norman Lichtenberg, 24 Parkour Performer - Team Germany - Episode 5 - Eliminated

Level 1 Configuration: Lockjaw, Gear Head, Faceplant, Hyper Jump, Break Neck , Mag Wall

Episode 9: The Ultimate Beastmaster Championship

Competitors
 Corbin Mackin, 29 Veteran - Team UK - Episode 7 - Ultimate Beastmaster
 Max Sprenger- 2nd
 Jayden Irving, 26- 3rd
 James Drake- 4th
 Mark Greenham- 5th
 Hector Martinez, 20- 6th

Level 1
Level 1 Configuration: Lockjaw, Gear Head, Faceplant, Hyper Energy Coils, Chain Drive, Mag Wall

Level 2

Level 3

Level 4

Broadcast
The show has nine country-specific versions. These have separate hosts, and languages, with one competitor from each country competing in each of the first eight episodes of the series (barring any of the Semifinals episodes). The countries are the U.S., Brazil, Germany, Mexico, South Korea, France, Italy, United Kingdom and Australia.

The hosts for the show are Tiki Barber and CM Punk (U.S.); Rafinha Bastos and Anderson Silva (Brazil); Micky Beisenherz and Jeannine Michaelsen (Germany); Luis Ernesto Franco and Ines Sainz (Mexico); Seo Kyung Suk and Park Kyeong Rim (South Korea); Gilles Marini and Sandy Heribert (France); Francesco Facchinetti and Bianca Balti (Italy); Stu Bennett and Kate Abdo (U.K.); and Dannii Minogue and Nick Cummins (Australia).

Notes

References

2018 American television seasons